is an anime series by Sunrise Animation that aired on TV Tokyo.

The series' characters include Picco, Tocho, and Fufu, three animals who aim to recover the mystical scales of a fish, Aesop - that way Aesop will be able to fly again.

Characters
The main characters in Aesop World include:
 Aesop - The main character of the series. It is a mysterious giant fish that flies in the sky. It used to fly around the world, but for many years it has become impossible to fly by dropping scales.
 Picco - a female hamster. Naughty at times, but she is curious and cheerful.
 Tocho - a male platypus. He is gentle and strong and good at swimming, but can be very gluttonous at times and motivated as soon as food is involved.
 Fufu - a male ferret. A little weak and nice. Knowingly, his head spins quickly and comes up with various strategies.

References

External links
 Aesop World at Sunrise Animation
 

1999 Japanese television series debuts
1999 Japanese television series endings
1999 anime television series debuts
Japanese children's animated adventure television series
Japanese children's animated fantasy television series
Adventure anime and manga
Fantasy anime and manga
Japanese-language television shows
TV Tokyo original programming
Animated television series about mammals
Fictional hamsters
Fictional ferrets
Fictional monotremes
Animated television series about children
Animated television series about fish
Anthropomorphic animals
Works about friendship
Television shows set in Japan
Forests in fiction
Sunrise (company)